Klimoutsy is a rural locality (a selo) in Klimoutsevsky Selsoviet of Svobodnensky District, Amur Oblast, Russia. The population was 736 as of 2018. There are 9 streets.

Geography 
Klimoutsy is located on the bank of the Lono River, 51 km northwest of Svobodny (the district's administrative centre) by road. Semyonovka is the nearest rural locality.

References 

Rural localities in Svobodnensky District